The Peel River may refer to:

Peel River (New South Wales) in Australia
Peel River (Canada) in the Yukon and Northwest Territories, Canada